Thomas Perry (– November 1818) was an Irish luthier who introduced a type of bowed psaltery known as the cither viol or sultana. He is regarded as one of Ireland's most influential violin makers and is often referred to as 'The Irish Stradivari'. Perry's output was quite prolific and his shop has been credited with making over 4,000 instruments. His violins are usually numbered on the button and inscribed just below the button "PERRY DUBLIN".

Biography
Perry was probably born in County Laois, Ireland to John Perry, an established violin maker (died 1787), and worked in the Temple Bar of Dublin.

Career
Perry followed in the footsteps of his father, and began working as a luthier in his shop in Dublin. His earliest documented violin is dated 1764. Perry took over his fathers shop around 1766 and by 1770, Perry had established his business in nearby Anglesea Street. Perry operated the business until he died in 1818. His will indicates that he left his finished and unfinished instruments to his son-in-law, William Wilkinson, along with his working implements and his stock-in-trade. After Perry's death, Wilkinson operated the business under the name of 'Perry and Wilkinson'.

Thomas Perry numbered all his violins and is known to have made more than 4,000. As well as making first-class violins, Perry also made violas, cellos and at least one double-bass, some of which are in the collection of the National Museum of Ireland. He invented the cither-viol or sultana in the 1760s and was renowned for the quality and beauty of his instruments. Tradition has it that Perry was able to copy an Amati lent to him by the Duke of Leinster, but his other models are of a more Tyrolean type or reminiscent of the work of Richard Duke in London.

The violin maker Richard Tobin, who later set up business in London, was one of his apprentices, and Vincenzo Panormo worked with Perry prior to moving to London. His pupils included violin makers John Delany, John Mackintosh, William Ringwood, and William Wilkinson (1771-1838), who married Perry's eldest daughter Elizabeth in June 1794 and carried on the business after Perry's death until 1839.

Instrument list

Violins
 1764 (no. 35): The Leixlip Perry, earliest identified Perry instrument
 1768 (no. 408): last identified from Christ Church Yard
  (no. ?): The Longford Perry
  (no. 418): sold by Tarisio in 2011 (Cozio 23823)
 1771 (no. 540): earliest identified from Anglesea Street
 1772 (no. 535): sold by Sotheby's on 22 March 1994
 1780 (no. ?): The Papini Perry, formerly Cruise collection, used by Guido Papini, National Museum of Ireland, Dublin
 1780 (no. ?): Cruise Violin II, formerly Cruise collection, National Museum of Ireland, Dublin
 1782 (no. 1144)
 1792 (no. 1709)
 1795 (no. 2084)
  (no. 3440): Sotheby’s auction catalogue, 22 November 1984, lot 95

Cither viols & sultanas
 1767: National Museum of Ireland, Dublin
 1767: Victoria and Albert Museum, London
 : Springer Sisters collection, Kent
 1769: The Trimble Perry, Gerald Trimble collection
 1770: National Museum of Ireland, Dublin
 : Gerald Trimble collection
 : Stearns collection, University of Michigan, Michigan
 1792: National Museums Liverpool
 1794: Museum of Fine Arts, Boston
 1802: National Museum of Ireland, Dublin

Viola d'amores
 1777 (no. 030): National Museum of Ireland, Dublin
 1801 (no. 2038): National Museum of Ireland, Dublin

Cellos & double basses
 (?): Cruise Cello, formerly Cruise collection, National Museum of Ireland, Dublin
 (?): Perry Bass, only identified double bass by Perry, National Museum of Ireland, Dublin

Guittars
 : The Takeuchi Perry, Taro Takeuchi collection
 1790: National Museum of Ireland, Dublin [1913.397]
 (?): National Museum of Ireland, Dublin [1908.17]
 (?): Victoria and Albert Museum, Dublin [222-1882]
 (?): Sotheby’s auction catalogue, 22 May 1986, lot 186, p. 174
 (?): Phillips auction catalogue, 14 September 1978, lot 41, p. 12
 (?): Sotheby’s auction catalogue, 14 February 1974, lot 34, p. 10

Pochettes
 : National Music Museum, South Dakota
 (?): National Museum of Ireland, Dublin

See also
John Delany (Irish luthier)
John Mackintosh (Irish luthier)
Thomas Molineux (Irish luthier)
George Ward (Irish luthier)

References

Bibliography
 A. McGoogan: "Thomas Perry: An Eighteenth-Century Irish Musical Instrument Maker", National Museum of Science and Art, Dublin Museum Bulletin, vol. 1, no. 3 (Dublin, 1911), p. 11−14
 W.H. Grattan Flood: "A Famous Dublin Fiddle Maker", in: The Irish Independent, 24 April 1920
 Joan Tighe: "Thomas Perry of Anglesea Street, Dublin", in: Dublin Historical Record vol. 18 no. 1 (1962), p. 24−31  
 Jane Ryan: "Thomas Perry and His Violins", in: The Irish Times, 18 August 1978 
 John Kenneth Rice: The Life and Work of Thomas Perry (unpublished MA thesis, Maynooth University, 1993)

Citations

External links
 Thomas Perry on Dublin Music Trade
 Thomas Perry on Brian Boydell Card Index
 Thomas Perry on Dictionary of Irish Biography
 Thomas Perry on Tarisio Auctions
 Perry violin at Musical Instrument Museum
 Perry cither viol at Victoria and Albert Museum
 Perry pochette at National Music Museum
 Gerald Trimble playing 1769 Perry cither viol (YouTube)

Irish luthiers
1738 births
1818 deaths
Musicians from County Laois